The 1988 United States presidential election in Florida took place on November 8, 1988. All fifty states and the District of Columbia, were part of the 1988 United States presidential election. Florida voters chose twenty-one electors to the Electoral College, which selected the president and vice president.

Florida was won by incumbent United States Vice President George H. W. Bush of Texas, who was running against Massachusetts Governor Michael Dukakis. Bush ran with Indiana Senator Dan Quayle as Vice President, and Dukakis ran with Texas Senator Lloyd Bentsen.

Florida weighed in for this election as 14% more Republican than the national average. Bush's 60.87% of the popular vote made it his fifth strongest state in the 1988 election after Utah, New Hampshire, Idaho and South Carolina. This is also the last time that a Republican won a majority of the vote in Pinellas County.

Bush won every county in the state, with the exception for North Florida’s majority-black Gadsden County, which voted narrowly for Dukakis. , this is the last election in which Miami-Dade County, Broward County, Palm Beach County, Alachua County, and Leon County voted for a Republican presidential candidate. This is the last election where Florida voted reliably Republican, afterward becoming a regular swing state for the next 30 years and the last time Florida was decided by double digits in a presidential race.

The presidential election of 1988 was a very partisan election for Florida, with more than 99% of the electorate voting for either the Democratic or Republican parties, and only four candidates appearing on the ballot. 

The election results in Florida are also reflective of a nationwide reconsolidation of base for the Republican Party, which took place through the 1980s. Through the passage of some very conservative economic programs, spearheaded by then President Ronald Reagan (called, collectively, "Reaganomics"), the mid-to-late 1980s saw a period of economic growth and stability. The hallmark of Reaganomics was partly the wide-scale deregulation of businesses and deep tax cuts. Dukakis ran his campaign on a socially liberal platform, and advocated for higher economic regulation and environmental protection. Bush, alternatively, ran on a campaign of continuing the social and economic policies of former President Reagan – which gained him much support with social conservatives and people living in rural areas. 

As of 2023, this is the most recent time Florida has voted to the right of the following states in a presidential election: Alabama, Indiana, Kansas, Mississippi, Nebraska, North Dakota, Oklahoma, South Dakota, and Texas.

Results

Results by county

See also
 Presidency of George H. W. Bush

References

Florida
1988
1988 Florida elections